The canton of Boulay-Moselle is an administrative division of the Moselle department, northeastern France. Its borders were modified at the French canton reorganisation which came into effect in March 2015. Its seat is in Boulay-Moselle.

It consists of the following communes:
 
Bannay
Bettange
Bionville-sur-Nied
Bisten-en-Lorraine
Boulay-Moselle
Brouck
Condé-Northen
Coume
Creutzwald
Denting
Éblange
Gomelange
Guerting
Guinkirchen
Ham-sous-Varsberg
Helstroff
Hinckange
Mégange
Momerstroff
Narbéfontaine
Niedervisse
Obervisse
Ottonville
Piblange
Roupeldange
Téterchen
Valmunster
Varize-Vaudoncourt
Varsberg
Velving
Volmerange-lès-Boulay

References

Cantons of Moselle (department)